Joseph Benjamin Hutto (April 26, 1926 – June 12, 1983) was an American blues musician. He was influenced by Elmore James and became known for his slide guitar playing and declamatory style of singing. He was inducted into the Blues Hall of Fame two years after his death.

Life and career
Joseph Benjamin Hutto was born in Blackville, South Carolina, the fifth of seven children. His family moved to Augusta, Georgia, when he was three years old. His father, Calvin, was a preacher. Joseph and his three brothers and three sisters formed a gospel group, the Golden Crowns, singing in local churches. Calvin Hutto died in 1949, and the family relocated to Chicago.

Hutto served as a draftee in the Korean War in the early 1950s, driving trucks in combat zones.

In Chicago, Hutto took up the drums and played with Johnny Ferguson and his Twisters. He also played the piano before settling on the guitar and performing on the streets with the percussionist Eddie "Porkchop" Hines. They added Joe Custom on second guitar and started playing club gigs. The harmonica player Earring George Mayweather joined after sitting in with the band. Hutto named his band the Hawks, after the wind that blows in Chicago. A recording session in 1954 resulted in the release of two singles by Chance Records. A second session later the same year, with the band supplemented by the pianist Johnny Jones, produced a third single.

Later in the 1950s Hutto became disenchanted with performing and gave it up after a woman broke his guitar over her husband's head one night in a club where he was playing. For the next eleven years he worked as a janitor in a funeral home to supplement his income. He returned to the music industry in the mid-1960s, with a new version of the Hawks featuring Herman Hassell on bass and Frank Kirkland on drums. His recording career resumed with a session for Vanguard Records, released on the compilation album Chicago/The Blues/Today! Vol. 1, followed by albums for Testament and Delmark. The 1968 Delmark album Hawk Squat, which featured Sunnyland Slim on organ and piano, Lee Jackson on guitar, and Maurice McIntyre on tenor saxophone, is regarded as Hutto's best album up to this point.

After Hound Dog Taylor died in 1975, Hutto took over Taylor's band, the House Rockers, for a time. In the late 1970s, he moved to Boston and recruited a new band, the New Hawks, with whom he recorded studio albums for the Varrick label. His 1983 Varrick album, Slippin' & Slidin''', the last of his career and later reissued on CD as Rock with Me Tonight, has been described as "near-perfect".

Death and legacy

In the early 1980s Hutto returned to Illinois, where he was diagnosed with carcinoid cancer. He died in 1983, at the age of 57, in Harvey. He was interred at Restvale Cemetery, in Alsip, Illinois.

In 1985, the Blues Foundation inducted Hutto into its Hall of Fame. His nephew, Lil' Ed Williams (of Lil' Ed and the Blues Imperials) has carried on his legacy, playing and singing in a style close to his uncle's.

A mid-1960s, red Montgomery Ward Res-O-Glas Airline guitar is often referred to as a J. B. Hutto model. Hutto was not a paid endorser, but he made the guitar famous by appearing with it on the cover of his Slidewinder album. Jack White later became well known for using the guitar and the model is today more closely associated with him, although it retains the Hutto name.

Discography
Singles
 "Combination Boogie" / "Now She’s Gone", J. B. and His Hawks (Chance Records; CH-1155), 1954
 "Lovin' You" / "Pet Cream Man", J. B. and His Hawks (Chance Records; CH-1160), 1954
 "Dim Lights" / "Things Are So Slow", J. B. Hutto and His Hawks (Chance Records; CH-1165), 1954

AlbumsChicago/The Blues/Today! Vol. 1 (Vanguard, 1966, five tracks only, remainder of record by Junior Wells and Otis Spann)Masters of Modern Blues (Testament, 1967)Hawk Squat (Delmark, 1968)Slidewinder (Delmark, 1973)Slideslinger (Black & Blue, 1982)Slippin’ & Slidin’ (Varrick, 1983) - Reissued on CD as Rock With Me Tonight (Bullseye Blues & Jazz, 1999)Bluesmaster (JSP, 1985)J. B. Hutto and The Houserockers Live 1977 (Wolf, 1991)

See also
Blues Hall of Fame
List of blues musicians
List of Chicago blues musicians
List of slide guitarists

References

Bibliography
Leadbitter, Mike, and Neil Slaven (1987). Blues Records 1943 to 1970, a Selective Discography, Volume One, A to K. Record Information Services, London.
Rowe, M. (1981). Chicago Blues: The City and the Music. Da Capo Press. .
van Rijn, G. (2004). Truman and Eisenhower Blues: African-American Blues and Gospel Songs, 1945–1960''. Continuum. .

1926 births
1983 deaths
Grammy Award winners
American blues guitarists
American male guitarists
American blues singers
Slide guitarists
People from Blackville, South Carolina
Deaths from cancer in Illinois
Vanguard Records artists
Musicians from Augusta, Georgia
20th-century American guitarists
20th-century American singers
Guitarists from Georgia (U.S. state)
20th-century American male musicians
Black & Blue Records artists
Janitors
American military personnel of the Korean War
Burials at Restvale Cemetery